Julius F. Harder was an American architect based in New York City.  He was a principal in the firm Isreals & Harder.  Before starting his own firm with Isreals, Harder had worked for architect John Rochester Thomas.

He designed the Palmetto Building, a skyscraper built during 1912-1913 that was then the tallest building in the state of South Carolina.  The building's construction was supervised by local architects Wilson & Sompayrac.

He designed the award-winning Samuel Hahnemann Monument, Reservation 64, Massachusetts & Rhode Island Aves. at Scott Cir. NW Washington, DC (Harder, Julius F.), NRHP-listed

He served as treasurer of the Architectural League of America at its fifth annual convention.

References

Architects from New York City
Year of birth missing
Year of death unknown